Gölcük may refer to:

Places in Turkey
Gölcük, Acıpayam
Gölcük, Aydın, a village in Aydın District, Aydın Province
Gölcük, Bolu, a village in Bolu District, Bolu Province
Gölcük, Çardak
Gölcük, Dursunbey, a village
Gölcük, Kestel
Gölcük, İzmir, a town in Ödemiş district, İzmir Province
Gölcük, Kocaeli, a district center in Kocaeli Province
Gölcük, Kumluca, a village in Kumluca District, Antalya Province
Gölcük, Mudurnu, a village in Mudumu District, Bolu Province

Other uses
Gölcük Barbaros Hayrettin Lisesi, a public high school in Gölcük, Kocaeli, Turkey
Gölcük Naval Shipyard, a naval shipyard of the Turkish Navy
Gölcük Naval Base, the main base of the Turkish Navy
Gölcük Plateau, a plateau in Yalihuyuk town of Konya Province, Turkey